Jasienie  (German Jaschine, after 1934 Eschenwalde) is a village in the administrative district of Gmina Lasowice Wielkie, within Kluczbork County, Opole Voivodeship, in south-western Poland.

The village has a population of 873.

References

Jasienie